Sons of the Oak is an epic fantasy novel by American writer David Farland, the  fifth book in his series The Runelords.. It chronicles the life of the Earth King Gaborn Val Orden's son Fallion as he matures and begins to discover powers even his father didn't have.

Plot introduction
Sons of the Oak is an epic fantasy novel set in a land where men can bestow to each other a number of endowments, granting the recipient of the endowment attributes such as increased strength, a more acute sense of hearing, or better eyesight.  The novel combines traditional sword and sorcery elements of fantasy with its own unique magic system of endowments.

Book divisions
Unlike previous books, this novel has no sections, only chapters.

Plot summary
The book details the life of Fallion and his rise to power. When the Earth King, Gaborn val Orden dies, the nations mobilize to destroy his children, fearing they'll usurp power over the kingdoms. An army quickly arrives, led by the locus Asgaroth. Fallion, his brother, Jaz, and Rhianna, a girl they rescued from monsters called strengi-saats, flee with their mother and the family of Sir Borenson. Asgaroth eventually catches up with them but his host is slain by Fallion's mother, Iome. The exiles board a smuggler's ship and flee the Courts of Tide. Fallion befriends the captain and most of the crew—including a flameweaver they call Smoker. Smoker recognizes Fallion's power, calling him the torch bearer, and begins teaching him how to use his abilities. Eventually Fallion and Jaz are captured by the evil Runelord Shadoath, who is parasitized by the locus of the One True Master of Evil. She tortures them in order to win their loyalty, but they, along with Shadoath's daughter, are rescued by Myrrima and Smoker. Smoker transforms into a fire elemental, destroying the city where the children were being held captive and seriously wounding Shadaoth. Only her numerous endowments of stamina and brawn save her. During this, Rhianna is mistakenly presumed dead and left behind, where she becomes a Dedicate to the sea ape of Shadoath's son.

Five years pass, and Fallion and Jaz grow older in the land of Landesfallen. Shadaoth eventually tracks them down, and finds the hidden lair of the Gwardeen, a group of child graak riders. Fallion realizes she is coming and leaves to look for her Dedicates. As she begins her assault on the Gwardeen base, Fallion locates her Dedicate Keep and wounds the sea ape while entering. Among the Dedicates is Rhianna, who he'd supposed dead. As the sea ape dies, she revives. Unable to slaughter so many innocents, Fallion awakens his powers as a flameweaver and Bright One. This destroys several loci residing in the innocent children Shadaoth has taken, including Asgaroth which had possessed Rhianna. When Shadoath realizes what has happened, she tries to flee back to the remnant of the One True World. Fallion follows her there, destroys Shadoath and injures the One True Master of Evil within her. The One True Master of Evil abandons Shadoath and escapes.

Main characters
Fallion: Gaborn Val Orden's oldest son, Fallion is described as an unassuming hero. He is charged by his father to create his army so that he may one day become greater than Gaborn.
Jaz: Named after Queen Iome's father, Jaz is the second son of Gaborn. He is a small boy who loves animals and shies away from conflict.
Borenson: The previous captain of the guard, Borenson is charged with raising the two princes after the deaths of both Iome and Gaborn.
Myrrima: The wife of Borenson, Myrrima has many endowments, and is feared in combat. She is also a water wizard, which means she is powerful in healing and protective magic.
Rhianna: The daughter of Erin of Fleeds and Celinor Anders, Rhianna is raped by a strengi-saat and left for dead. She is rescued by Fallion, and swears to always protect him. She has an endowment of metabolism, which enables her to excel in combat.
Talon, Draken, Sage, and Erin: Borenson's young children whom he raises along with Fallion and Jaz.
Smoker: A flameweaver who teaches Fallion how to wield the power of Fire.

American fantasy novels
Runelords series
2006 American novels
Tor Books books